Central Bank of Denver v. First Interstate Bank of Denver, 511 U.S. 164 (1994), was a decision by the United States Supreme Court, which held private plaintiffs may not maintain aiding and abetting suit under Securities Exchange Act § 10(b).

The majority opinion in the case established that liability did not extend to “aiders or abettors” that participate in misstatements or omissions in connection with the sale of securities. The Supreme Court held that "private civil liability under Rule 10b-5 does not extend to those who do not engage in a manipulative or deceptive practice but who aid and abet such a violation of 10(b)." This distinguished between the primary liability of violators of Rule 10b-5 and non-primary defendants, who had not directly deceived investors. This was a more literal reading than hitherto of Section 10(b) of the Securities Exchange Act of 1934 and the Securities and Exchange Commission’s Rule 10b-5, which prohibit fraud or deceit in connection with the purchase or sale of securities.

The Supreme Court's ruling reversed a long history of court decisions and SEC enforcement actions where aiders and abettors, often banks, accountants, trustees, and attorneys, were found liable under Rule 10b-5. The case makes the distinction between primary violators, who directly misstate or omit material facts that are relied upon by investors, and aiders and abettors. According to the court:  “A plaintiff must show reliance on the defendant's misstatement or omission to recover under 10b-5. Basic Inc. v. Levinson, supra, at 243. Were we to allow the aiding and abetting action proposed in this case, the defendant could be liable without any showing that the plaintiff relied upon the aider and abettor's statement or actions. . . .".  When investors relied on such statements or actions, the court extends Rule 10b-5 liability to these secondary participants. The Court stated that "any person or entity, including a lawyer, accountant, or bank, who employs a manipulative device or makes a material misstatement (or omission) on which a purchaser or seller of securities relies may be liable as a primary violator under 10b-5. . .."

See also
 List of United States Supreme Court cases, volume 511
 List of United States Supreme Court cases
 Lists of United States Supreme Court cases by volume
 List of United States Supreme Court cases by the Rehnquist Court
Stoneridge Investment Partners v. Scientific-Atlanta (2008)

Further reading

External links
 

United States Supreme Court cases
United States Supreme Court cases of the Rehnquist Court
United States securities case law
1994 in United States case law
Implied statutory cause of action case law